The 1947 Campeonato Argentino de Rugby  was won by the selection of Buenos Aires Province ("Provincia") that beat in the final 18-4 the selection of Capital.

Rugby Union in Argentina in 1947
 The "Championship of Buenos Aires" was won by Club Universitario de Buenos Aires
 The "Cordoba Province Championship" was won by Jockey Club Córdoba
 The North-East Championship was won by Club Natación y Gimnasia

Results

Final 

 Provincia R. J. Frigerio (Pucará), J. Santiago (Hindú), R. del Molino Torres cap. (C.A.S.I.), P. Bereciartúa (Pucará), L. Caffarone (Olivos), R. Giles (Pucará), G. Ehrman (Pucará), J. Lockwood (Old Georgian), R. Aldao (C.A.S.I.), B. Grigolón (Hindú), A. González Bonorino (Olivos), J. S. Morganti (S.I.C.), A. Guyot (C.A.S.I.), C. Swain (Old Georgian), F. Petersen (Curupaytí) 
 Capital   :D.A. Forrester (Belgrano), P. Torres García (Obras S.), R. D. H. Brown cap. (Belgrano), J. Sansot (C.U.B.A., A. Fernández Moores (C.U.B.A., R. Ross (Belgrano), E. Holmberg (C.U.B.A., J. O'Farrell (C.U.B.A., R. MacKay (GEBA), S. Racimo (GEBA), H. Crippa (Obras S.), L. Maurette (C.U.B.A., F. Elizalde (C.U.B.A., H. Achával (C.U.B.A., R. Lucotti (Belgrano).

Bibliography 
  Memorias de la UAR 1947
  III Campeonato Argentino

Campeonato Argentino de Rugby
Argentina
Campeonato